Hill 40 is a militarily historic landform on the island of Guam. This hill was the scene of some of the most intense fighting during the landing phase of the 1944 Battle of Guam as Allied forces sought to establish their beachhead against the defending Japanese forces. The American 4th Marine Regiment of the 1st Provisional Marine Brigade captured Hill 40 on June 21, 1944, the day of the landing. That night the Japanese launched a counteroffensive that successfully retook the hill on three occasions. The Marines regrouped and regained the hill each time. The final push came in the early morning hours of July 22. The Japanese 38th Regiment was wiped out during this military action, with 345 killed on the Bangi Point plain, immediately west of Hill 40 near the beach.

Hill 40 was listed on the National Register of Historic Places in 1975.

See also
National Register of Historic Places listings in Guam

References

World War II on the National Register of Historic Places in Guam
Geography of Guam
Agat, Guam